The 1932 Railway Cup Hurling Championship was the sixth series of the inter-provincial hurling Railway Cup. Two matches were played between 28 February and 17 March 1932. It was contested by Connacht, Leinster and Munster.

Munster entered the championship as the defending champions.

On 17 March 1932, Leinster won the Railway Cup after a 6-08 to 4-04 defeat of Munster in the final at Croke Park, Dublin. This was their second title over all and their first since 1927. The final was notable in that the first ever point scored directly from a sideline cut occurred in it, after a rule change by Central Council the day before. Paddy Drennan of Leinster is credited as being the first scorer.

Leinster's Din O'Neill was the Railway Cup top scorer with 5-04.

Results

Semi-final

Final

Top scorers

Top scorers overall

Sources
 Donegan, Des, The Complete Handbook of Gaelic Games (DBA Publications Limited, 2005).
 Fennelly, Teddy and Dowling, Paddy, "Ninety Years of GAA in Laois" (Leinster Express, 1975)

External links
 Munster Railway Cup-winning teams

Railway Cup Hurling Championship
Railway Cup Hurling Championship